{{Automatic taxobox
| taxon = Milyeringa
| authority = Whitley, 1945
| type_species = Milyeringa veritas
| type_species_authority = Whitley, 1945<ref name = CoF>{{Cof record|genid=7003|title=Milyeringa|access-date=21 July 2018}}</ref>
}}Milyeringa is a genus of blind cavefish from the Cape Range and Barrow Island, northwestern Australia. Although traditionally considered to belong to the family Eleotridae, studies show that they represent a distinct and far-separated lineage together with the Typhleotris cavefish from Madagascar, leading some to move them to their own family, Milyeringidae.

Species
The recognized species of this genus are:

 Milyeringa justitia Larson & Foster, 2013 (Barrow cave gudgeon)
 Milyeringa veritas'' Whitley, 1945 (blind gudgeon)

References

 
Milyeringidae
Taxonomy articles created by Polbot
Fish genera